The 1995 Wismilak Open, also known as the Surabaya Women's Open,  was a women's tennis tournament played on outdoor hard courts at the Embong Sawo Sports Club in Surabaya, Indonesia that was part of Tier IV of the 1995 WTA Tour. It was the second edition of the tournament and was held from 2 October until 8 October 1995. Second-seeded Shi-Ting Wang won the singles title.

Finals

Singles

 Shi-Ting Wang defeated   Jing-Qian Yi 6–1, 6–1
 It was Wang's first singles title of the year and the fourth of her career.

Doubles

 Petra Kamstra /  Tina Križan defeated  Nana Miyagi /  Stephanie Reece 2–6, 6–4, 6–1
 It was Kamstra's only doubles title of her career. It was Križan's first doubles title of her career.

References

External links
 ITF tournament edition details
 Tournament draws

Wismilak International
Commonwealth Bank Tennis Classic
1995 in Indonesian tennis